Cornamaddy is a townland in Athlone, County Westmeath, Ireland. The townland is in the civil parish of St. Mary's.

The townland is in the northeast of the town. The N55 motorway enters the townland as it meets Athlone from the north.

References 

Townlands of County Westmeath